The  superyacht Constellation was launched at the Oceanco yard in Alblasserdam. Monaco based The A Group designed the exterior of Constellation, with interior design by Fantini Design & The A Group. She has two sister ships, the 2001 built  Stargate and the 2000 built  Indian Empress.

Design 
The hull is built out of steel while the superstructure is made out of aluminium with teak laid decks. The yacht is built to ABS classification society rules, issued by Qatar.

Engines 
She is powered by twin 8160.0 hp MTU 20V 1163 TB73L diesel engines.

Support vessel 
Constellation has a  support vessel named Al Shoua. She was built as the offshore service vessel Interceptor in 1980. Shadow Marine converted the vessel into a support vessel in 2008.

Fire 
On the 11th of August 2019 the storage building where Constellation and two other yachts ( Maracunda &  Al Adaid) were kept, caught fire. The building eventually  collapsed and in the process severely damaging, the stored yachts. As off December 2020, only Al Adaid is back in service. It is unknown whether the other two will be repaired.

See also
 List of motor yachts by length
 List of yachts built by Oceanco
 Luxury yacht
 Oceanco

References

1999 ships
Motor yachts
Ships built in the Netherlands